Kovin Airport ( / Aerodrom Kovin) is an airport in the Kovin Municipality, Vojvodina, Serbia. The airport is near the town of Smederevo and 45 km (28 mi) east of central Belgrade.

The airport is a military airport and is used by the Serbian Air Force and Air Defence. In 1998, a Jat Airways McDonnell Douglas DC-9-32 plane successfully made a forced landing at Kovin Airport.

See also 
 List of airports in Serbia
 Airports of Serbia
 Transport in Serbia
 AirSerbia

External links
 Šutanovac je kazao da je "jedan od važnih segmenata" aktivnosti Ministarstva odbrane konverzija vojnih aerodrome u Lađevcima, Batajnici, a možda i u Ponikvama i Kovinu.
 Poleće biznis sa vojne piste

Airports in Serbia
Buildings and structures in Vojvodina
Banat
Yugoslav Air Force bases